Mohammed Ali Bemaamer is a Moroccan professional footballer who plays as a defensive midfielder for MAS Fes.
He was part of the triple crown MAS Fes won in 2011 during which time he scored a penalty kick by way of rebound from the post with back spin, allowing the goalkeeper to mistakenly stand up in celebration before the ball crossed the line. This has earned Bemammer a much revered status amongst the Masawi faithful.

Honours
MAS Fes
CAF Confederation Cup: 2011
Moroccan Throne Cup: 2011
CAF Super Cup: 2012

Morocco Local
African Nations Championship: 2020

References

External links
 

1989 births
Living people
Moroccan footballers
Maghreb de Fès players
Raja CA players
Difaâ Hassani El Jadidi players
AS FAR (football) players
Ittihad Tanger players
Morocco international footballers
Botola players
2020 African Nations Championship players
Association football midfielders
Morocco A' international footballers